Proprioseiulus is a genus of mites in the Phytoseiidae family.

Species
 Proprioseiulus darwinensis (Schicha, 1987)
 Proprioseiulus paxi (Muma, 1965)
 Proprioseiulus sandersi (Chant, 1959)

References

Phytoseiidae